This is a list of neurochemists.

 David R. Brown
 Fernando Garcia de Mello
 Michaela Jaksch
 David Nutt
 Candace Pert
 Juda Hirsch Quastel
 John Raymond Smythies
 Tilli Tansey
 Johann Ludwig Wilhelm Thudichum

See also 

 Neurochemistry
 List of neuroscientists

 
Neurochemists